RGS Dodderhill is a private school on the outskirts of Droitwich Spa, Worcestershire, England. Girls & Boys are educated from 2–11 years of age - most boys continue their education at RGS Worcester, and the majority of the girls continue their education at RGS Dodderhill Senior School which is specialised for Girls only.

History
Dodderhill School was founded in 1945 as the senior girls' school of Whitford Hall, a well-established prep school located in Bromsgrove. In 1999, Whitford Hall moved to the village of Dodderhill and was known as "Whitford Hall and Dodderhill School" until 2006. On 30 April 2019, Dodderhill School merged with the RGS Worcester family of schools, and is now known as RGS Dodderhill. In September 2021, RGS Dodderhill Prep School became co-educational, whilst the Senior School remains exclusively for Girls.

Academics
RGS Dodderhill has a strong academic record despite its relatively small size compared to other independent schools in the area. The broad curriculum and preparation for GCSEs was commended in the 2017 ISI inspection reports.

References

External links
School Website
Profile on the ISC website
ISI Inspection Reports

Private schools in Worcestershire
Girls' schools in Worcestershire
Member schools of the Girls' Schools Association